Spilosoma fujianensis is a moth in the family Erebidae. It was described by Cheng-Lai Fang in 1981. It is found in Fujian, China.

References

Moths described in 1981
fujianensis